Dogna  is a comune (municipality) in the Province of Udine in the Italian region Friuli-Venezia Giulia, located about  northwest of Trieste and about  north of Udine.

Dogna borders the following municipalities: Chiusaforte, Malborghetto Valbruna, Moggio Udinese, Pontebba.

Demographic evolution

References

External links
 www.comune.dogna.ud.it/

Cities and towns in Friuli-Venezia Giulia